S. maculata may refer to:

 Sabatia maculata, a plant endemic to the eastern United States
 Saccogaster maculata, a viviparous brotula
 Salisia maculata, a herbaceous plant
 Sarangesa maculata, an African butterfly
 Scapteira maculata, a lizard endemic to northwestern Africa
 Scardamia maculata, a geometer moth
 Schinia maculata, a flower moth
 Scolia maculata, a very large wasp
 Selenaria maculata, a moss animal
 Setia maculata, a sea snail
 Shebania maculata, a snout moth
 Sigapatella maculata, a sea snail
 Sillago maculata, a coastal marine fish
 Siphona maculata, a tachina fly
 Skenea maculata, a sea snail
 Solariella maculata, a top snail
 Spermophora maculata, a cellar spider
 Spiloconis maculata, a net-winged insect
 Squilla maculata, a mantis shrimp
 Stachyris maculata, an Old World babbler
 Stagmomantis maculata, a mantis native to the Americas
 Stathmopoda maculata, a concealer moth
 Statilia maculata, a praying mantis
 Stauntonia maculata, a flowering plant
 Stellognatha maculata, a flat-faced longhorn
 Stomatella maculata, a sea snail
 Stratiomys maculata, a soldier fly
 Subula maculata, an auger snail
 Swanka maculata, a mud turtle
 Symbolia maculata, a long-legged fly
 Synapta maculata, a sea cucumber
 Synaptula maculata, a sea cucumber
 Synemon maculata, a diurnal moth